Shwartz is a surname. Notable people with the surname include:

Susan Shwartz (born 1949), American author
Patty Shwartz (born 1961), American judge
Ofir Shwartz (born 1979), Israeli jazz pianist, composer, arranger, and record producer
Benjamin Shwartz (born 1979), American-Israeli conductor